The 2020 Abilene Christian Wildcats football team represented Abilene Christian University in the 2020–21 NCAA Division I FCS football season as a member of the Southland Conference. The Wildcats were led by fourth-year head coach Adam Dorrel and played their home games at Anthony Field at Wildcat Stadium. The Wildcats finished the season with a 1–5 overall record.

Previous season
The Wildcats finished the 2019 season with a 5–7 overall record, and a 4–5 record in Southland play to finish in a tie for sixth place.

Preseason

Preseason poll
The Southland Conference released their original preseason poll in July 2020. The Wildcats were picked to finish seventh in the conference, prior to their schedule split from the rest of the league. In addition, four Wildcats were chosen to the Preseason All-Southland Team

(*) These teams opted out of playing in the revised spring 2021 Southland schedule, and instead played as Independent in the fall of 2020.

Preseason All–Southland Teams

Offense

1st Team
Branden Hohenstein – Tight End/Halfback, SR

2nd Team
Bill McCrary – Running Back, SR
Kade Parmelly – Offensive Lineman, SR

Defense

1st Team
Kameron Hill – Defensive Lineman, SR

Schedule
Abilene Christian had a game scheduled against Texas A&M, which was canceled due to the COVID-19 pandemic.

Source:

Game summaries

at UTEP

at Army

West Texas A&M

vs. Stephen F. Austin

at Mercer

Angelo State

Arizona Christian

at Virginia

References

Abilene Christian
Abilene Christian Wildcats football seasons
Abilene Christian Wildcats football